Zenz is a surname of German origin. People with that name include:

Adrian Zenz, German anthropologist
Therese Zenz, German sprint canoer

See also
 Zens, a former municipality in the district of Salzlandkreis, in Saxony-Anhalt, Germany
 

Surnames of German origin